Hakon Jarl, Haakon Jarl, or variants, may refer to:

People
Haakon Sigurdsson (c. 937 – 995), ruler of Norway 975–995
Haakon Ericsson (c. 1029 – 1030), last of the Jarls of Lade, ruler of Norway 1012–1015
Haakon Ivarsson (c. 1027 – 1080), jarl under Harald Hardrada
Haakon Paulsson, co-ruler of Orkney with Magnus Erlendsson (1105–1123)

Other uses
Hakon Jarl (Smetana), a symphonic poem, 1860–1861

See also
Hakon Jarl runestones, in Sweden